Friedrich Dickmann was a German politician. He was the mayor of Marburg from 5 February until 31 July 1946.

References 

Year of birth unknown
Politicians from Wuppertal
Mayors of Marburg
1896 births
1973 deaths